Beinn Tulaichean is a Scottish mountain. It is not much more than the southern top of Cruach Ardrain, with a descent of only 120m before the ascent to its larger neighbour. It is located approximately 10 km to the north of Loch Katrine close to the site of Robert Roy MacGregor's house.

References

 The Munros, Scottish Mountaineering Trust, 1986, Donald Bennett (Editor) 

Munros
Mountains and hills of the Southern Highlands
Mountains and hills of Stirling (council area)